I Am Sonic Rain are an instrumental and post-rock band from Treviso, Italy. They formed in 2001 in Treviso, Italy. They have released two albums on Deep Elm Records.

They are made up of Giulio Signorotto (guitar), Francesco Vettor (guitar), Marco Longo (guitar), Federico Cipolla (bass), and for the first and the third album Alessandro Carlozzo (drum).

Previous members have included Andrea Sara (Synths and Piano), Alessandro Stival (Drum), Riccardo Trevisi (Drum) and Alessio Centenaro (Drum).

In July 2005 the band released their debut album It’s falling on us and after release in September 2010 through the independent record label Deep Elm Records. The band released a second album in 2010, Between Whales and Feverish Lights, also through Deep Elm Records. The album has received generally positive reviews.

In 2017 the Band started recording a third album.

Members

Current 
 Giulio Signorotto - Guitar
 Vettor Francesco - Guitar
 Marco Longo - Guitar
 Federico Cipolla - Bass
 Alessandro Carlozzo - Drum

Former 
 Andrea Sara - Organ, Piano, Synth (2009 – 2011)
 Riccardo Trevisi - Drum Pre 2000
 Alessandro Carlozzo - Drum (2000 – 2006)
 Alessandro Stival - Drum (2008 – 2011)
 Alessio Centenaro - Drum (2014 – 2016)

Discography

Studio albums 
 2005 - It’s falling on us (Deep Elm Records)
 2010 - Between Whales and Feverish Lights (Deep Elm Records)
 2017 - Hidden (Deep Elm Records)

Singles and EPs 
 2005 - Sleepless

Compilations 
 2012 - Postrockology (Fog Is Drowning Us) (Deep Elm Records)

External links 
 
 I Am Sonic Rain at Last.Fm

Italian rock music groups
Musical groups established in 2001
Post-rock